Chaillac (Limousin: Chalhac) is a commune in the Indre department in central France.

Geography
The commune is traversed by the river Anglin. The surrounding land is primarily clay which results in ground cracking and building shifts throughout the region.

History
Château de Brosse, located on the old town of Brosse, was the possession of Viscount de Brosse, who were powerful in the Middle Ages, and even had their own mint in the eleventh century. However, the village was created around the castle, located in a cul-de-sac, Chaillac was never completed, especially after being destroyed by the Anglo-Poitou in 1370.

Population

See also
Communes of the Indre department
 Rochechouart impact structure
 Saint-Benoît-du-Sault
 Château de Brosse

References

Communes of Indre